Ivan Magomu (born 6 September 1993) is a Ugandan rugby union player who plays as flyhalf for Black Pirates Rugby Club in the country's top tier rugby premier league and the men's fifteens rugby national team, the Uganda national rugby union team known as the Uganda Rugby Cranes. He is the captain of the Black Pirates Rugby Club, a role he has served since 2018. Ahead of the 2021 Rugby Africa Cup, Magomu was named captain of the Uganda national rugby union team.

He has also previously played for the Uganda national rugby sevens team and featured at the Rugby World Cup Sevens 2018 in San Francisco, USA.

Magomu has been described as one of the best flyhalves Uganda has ever produced, and has been compared to 2007 Africa Cup champion Edmond Tumusiime who has since admitted that Magomu is miles better than he was.

Professional career 

Magomu holds a Bachelor of Law degree from Uganda Christian University and is currently undergoing his bar course at the Uganda Law Development Center. In 2021, he was named as a member of the legal commission of the Uganda Olympic Committee.
Magomu is the current Captain of Uganda national rugby union team

References 

Living people
1993 births
Uganda Christian University alumni
Ugandan rugby union players